Jensy Gregory (née Anthony), also known mononymously as Jensy (also spelt Jency), is an Indian playback singer who has worked with composers like Ilayaraaja in Tamil films.

Career
Jensy Gregory hails from a family of musicians and music came into her life at a very young age. Her debut song was for Malayalam film Vezhambal. She was introduced to the Tamil movie industry in the song "Vaanathu Poonkili" in the movie Thiripurasundari scored by Ilayaraja. Her songs that followed were in many blockbuster movies like Mullum Malarum and Priya.

In September 2010, Srikanth Deva read one of the Jensy interviews and decided to give the talented singer a break in one of the movies that he was composing for. After the song recording was over, both director, John Mahendran and music director were heard saying that even after all these years Jensy's voice had not aged.

Discography

Tamil songs
Most of her Tamil film songs are scored by Ilayaraja.

Malayalam songs

References

External links 
 Jensy, list of songs
  Coming out of recluse
 Tamizh Cinema, Back with a Bang

Indian women playback singers
Jensy
Jensy
Living people
Film musicians from Kerala
Women musicians from Kerala
20th-century Indian women singers
20th-century Indian singers
Year of birth missing (living people)